Beaverhead County High School is a high school in the small town of Dillon, Beaverhead County, Montana.

Sports

The Dillon Beavers have been the Class "A" State Football Champions 8 times since 2000. They have won the championship in 2000, 2003, 2005, 2006, 2011, 2013, 2014, and 2016. In 1990, 1999, 2007, 2009, 2012, 2016, and 2017 the Beavers won the Class "A" State Boys Basketball Championship.  The Beavers also won state boys basketball titles in 1920 and 1946 before the current classification system had been created.  In 1991, 1995, and 2003 the Beavers won the Class "A" State Girls Basketball Championship.  In 2016 the Beavers won the Class "A" Boys Track Championship.

Also they won the boys 2006 State Cross Country State Champions for the first time ever. The girls volleyball and cross country received runner-up honors at state the same year.  During the 2006–07 school year, Beaverhead County High School sports teams won 3 state championships, 2 runner-up trophies, and 6 divisional first-place trophies.

See also
 List of high schools in Montana

References

External links
 

Schools in Beaverhead County, Montana
Public high schools in Montana